Lucio Margallo is a 1992 Filipino biographical action film directed by Augusto Salvador. The film stars Phillip Salvador as the titular policeman, alongside Miguel Rodriguez, Tirso Cruz III, Jean Garcia, Paquito Diaz and Edwin Reyes. The film depicts the true story of police officer Margallo and his partner Sgt. Goyena (Cruz) of the Western Police District (WPD) who come to face off against a dangerous drug syndicate with ties to officials from their own police agency. Produced by Moviestars Production, the film was released on July 22, 1992.

Critic Justino Dormiendo of the Manila Standard gave Lucio Margallo a positive review, commending its action scenes and performances which helped the film overcome its formulaic plot. The film won the FAMAS Award for Best Editing (Rene Tala and Danny Gloria), tying with Ikaw Pa Lang ang Minahal.

Cast

Phillip Salvador as Lucio Margallo
Miguel Rodriguez as Alexander Sarmiento
Tirso Cruz III as Sgt. Goyena
Jean Garcia as Hermie Margallo
Odette Khan as Candeng
Dencio Padilla as Temyong
Paquito Diaz as Dante
Edwin Reyes as Bigboy
Zandro Zamora as Maj. Razon
Johnny Vicar as Maj. Gamboa
Max Laurel as the mayor
Eric Francisco as Manoling
Bunny Paras as Elena
Karen Salas as Karen
Fred Moro as Palos
Bernard Atienza as Turo
Eric Borbon as Balbon
Renato del Prado as Pedring
Jason Bonus as Buboy
Treisha Rodil as Baby
Janus del Prado as Goyena's son
Melissa Sosa as Goyena's daughter
Abegail Roque as Goyena's daughter
Manjo del Mundo as Berto
King Gutierrez as Turko
Jimmy Reyes as Jim Boy
Tony Tacorda as the warden
Rey Solo as Bulak
Polly Cadsawan as Mendez
Joey Padilla as Dizon
Rene Hawkins as Bombay
Jerome Advincula as Junior Buwang

Release
Lucio Margallo was released in theaters on July 22, 1992.

Critical response
Justino Dormiendo, writing for the Manila Standard, gave the film a positive review. Though he found it to be compromised by "formula filmmaking," he commended the film's well-staged action scenes, "literate dialogue" and the "convincing" performances of Salvador, Cruz and Diaz, leading him to consider that the film "acquits itself exceedingly well." Dormiendo concluded that "We can only hope that the next time Salvador and company flex their cinematic muscles, the territory would be less than compromising..."

Accolades

References

External links

1992 films
1992 action films
Action films based on actual events
Films about police officers
Films set in Manila
Filipino-language films
Moviestars Production films
Philippine action films
Films directed by Augusto Salvador